Twobones is a Swiss mainstream jazz band founded in 1986. The core members of the group are trombone players Paul Haag and Danilo Moccia. Other members include Isla Eckinger (double bass), Peter Schmidlin (drums), and Tutilo Odermatt (piano).  They modeled their trombone duo band after trombonists J. J. Johnson and Kai Winding.

Discography

Studio albums

Live albums

References

Swiss jazz ensembles
Musical groups established in 1986
1986 establishments in Switzerland